The Society for Research Synthesis Methodology (abbreviated SRSM) is an international, interdisciplinary learned society dedicated to promoting and fostering the study of research synthesis: the process whereby the results of multiple scientific studies are combined. It was founded in November 2005, with its organizational meeting held on November 11 and 12 of that year. It has 85 active members. Its official journal is Research Synthesis Methods, which has been published by John Wiley & Sons since 2010. It holds annual meetings every summer for members (and, occasionally, nonmembers) to present their research. Its current president is Tianjing Li, and its president-elect is Terri Pigott.

Past presidents
 Georgia Salanti (2021–22)
 Jack Vevea (2019–21)
 Christopher H. Schmid (2018–19)
 Michael Borenstein (2017–18)
 Kay Dickersin (2016–17)
 Jessica Gurevitch (2015–16)
 Lesley Stewart (2014–15)
 William Shadish (2013–14)
 Hannah Rothstein (2012–13)
 Jesse Berlin (2011–12)
 David Jones (2010–11)
 John Ioannidis (2009–10)
 Larry V. Hedges (2008–09)
 Alex Sutton (2007–08)
 Betsy Becker (2006–07)
 Julian Higgins (2005–06)

References

External links

Research methods
Statistical societies
Scientific organizations established in 2005
International learned societies